The West Contra Costa Unified School District (WCCUSD; formerly known as Richmond School District) is the school district for western Contra Costa County, California. It is based in Richmond, California. In addition to Richmond, the district covers the cities of El Cerrito, San Pablo, Pinole, and Hercules and the unincorporated areas of Bayview-Montalvin Manor, East Richmond Heights, El Sobrante, Kensington, North Richmond, and Tara Hills.

History
The district currently has six neighborhood-assignment high schools, six neighborhood-assignment middle schools, and thirty-six neighborhood-assignment elementary and primary schools along with various continuation and alternative schools. The district website offers a graphical interactive tool for figuring out the boundaries and locations for neighborhood-assignment schools.

The WCCUSD incurred $42.5 million in debt when the then-named Richmond Unified School District went bankrupt in 1990 under Superintendent Walter Marks and the state, under court order, financed district operations. The bankruptcy affected the credit rating of the City of Richmond, therefore the name was changed. In 1991 the district had to be bailed out by the state. As of Fall 2005, the school district is $7 million in debt. The district has been lobbying IBM to forgive 5 million dollars in debt from obsolete computers purchased in 1989. To decrease expenditures, the district planned to close schools over the following two years.

Boundary
The district includes, in addition to Richmond: Bayview, East Richmond Heights, El Cerrito, El Sobrante, Kensington, Montalvin Manor, North Richmond, Pinole, Rollingwood, San Pablo, and Tara Hills. It also includes the majority of Hercules.

ACLU lawsuit
In 2012, the American Civil Liberties Union sued the district for the "decrepit" conditions at Community Day School. The alternative school was reported to have no electricity, heating, or bathrooms in addition to rampant rodent and feline excrement. Furthermore, the roof was leaking, there were insufficient seats or desks for students and mushrooms were found to be growing from the floor. Two-thirds of students were also reported as being chronically truant. It was also noted that there was not usually a math or science teacher available. Students needing to use a bathroom facility needed to be escorted by staff to Gompers Continuation High School. The stated goal of the suit was to improve the learning conditions and available supplies and opportunities for the small school body.

High schools
 De Anza High School
 El Cerrito High School
 Hercules Middle/High School
 John F. Kennedy High School
 Pinole Valley High School
 Richmond High School
 Middle College High School (within the campus of Contra Costa College)

Charters
 Leadership Public Schools (Richmond)

Continuation schools

 Greenwood Academy
 Transition Program Vista Hills
 Vista High
 Sierra
 Alvarado

Middle schools
 Adams Middle School (closed, effective 2009–2010 year)
 Betty Reid Soskin Middle School; formerly named Juan Crespi Middle School after Juan Crespí
 Helms Middle School
 Hercules Middle/High School
Fred T. Korematsu Middle School (formerly named Portola Middle School)
Lovonya DeJean Middle School
 Pinole Middle School

Charters
 Manzanita Charter Middle School
 Summit K2

K-8 schools 
 Elizabeth Stewart School

Elementary schools
 Alvarado Elementary School (closed 1987, currently Adult Education Alvarado Campus)
 Balboa Elementary School (closed 1989, currently Balboa Child Development Center)
 Bayview Elementary School
 Cameron School
 Castro Elementary School (closed effective 2009–2010 year—now site of completely new building for Fred T. Korematsu Middle School)
 César E. Chávez Elementary School

 Margaret Collins Elementary School
 Coronado Elementary School
 Del Mar Elementary School (closed 1987)
 Dover Elementary School
 El Monte Elementary School (open 1954, closed 1989)
 El Portal Elementary School (closed 1990)
 El Sobrante Elementary School (closed effective 2009–2010 year)
 Frances L. Ellerhorst Elementary School
 Fairmont Elementary School
 Jeston O. Ford International MicroSociety School
 Grant Elementary School
 Hanna Ranch Elementary School
 Harbour Way Academy
 Harding Elementary School
 Highland Elementary School
 Kensington Hilltop Elementary School
 Martin Luther King, Jr. Elementary School (originally Pullman School)
 Lake Elementary School
 Lincoln Elementary School
 Lupine Hills Elementary School (formerly Hercules Elementary School)
 Madera Elementary School
 Mira Vista Elementary School (K-8)
 Montalvin Manor Elementary School
 Murphy Elementary School
 Nystrom Magnet Elementary School
 Michelle Obama Elementary School (formerly Woodrow Wilson Elementary School)
 Ohlone Elementary School
 Olinda Elementary School
 John Peres Elementary School
 Riverside Elementary School
 Seaview Elementary School (closed, Fall 2005)
 Shannon Elementary School
 Sheldon Elementary School
 Richard Stege Elementary School
 Tara Hills Elementary School
 Transgender Learning Center
 Valley View Elementary School
 Verde Elementary School
 Washington Elementary School

Charters
 Richmond College Prep Schools (Preschool and K–6)

Notes

External links

 West Contra Costa Unified School District Official Website
 West Contra Costa Unified School District Official Website (Archive)

 
School districts in Contra Costa County, California
School districts established in 1965
1965 establishments in California